The decade of the 1430s in art involved some significant events.

Events
 1430: Considered end of Medieval art art period.
 1430: First use of optical methods in the creation of art.
 1430s: The engraver known as the Master of the Playing Cards becomes active in south-western Germany and Switzerland.
 1435: Leon Battista Alberti writes Della Pittura.
 1438-1440: Donatello completes his series of sculptures for the Cathedral of Prato.

Works

Paintings

 1425–1430: Masolino da Panicale – The Annunciation (National Gallery of Art, Washington, D.C.)
 1428–1432: Jan van Eyck (attrib.) – Saint Francis Receiving the Stigmata (2 versions)
 c.1430
 Domenico di Bartolo – Madonna and Child Enthroned with Saint Peter and Saint Paul (National Gallery of Art, Washington, D.C.)
 Jan van Eyck (attrib.) – Portrait of a Man with a Blue Chaperon
 c.1430–1432
 Fra Angelico – The Annunciation (for Convent of San Domenico, Fiesole; now Museo del Prado, Madrid)
 Stefano di Giovanni – Madonna of the Snows Altarpiece (Uffizi, Florence)
 c.1430–1440: Jan van Eyck – Crucifixion and Last Judgement diptych (Metropolitan Museum of Art, New York)
 1432: Jan van Eyck
 Ghent Altarpiece
 Léal Souvenir
 1432–1434: Fra Angelico – Annunciation of Cortona completed in Florence
 1433:
 Domenico di Bartolo – Madonna of Humility
 Rogier van der Weyden (attrib.) – Virgin and Child Enthroned (Thyssen-Bornemisza Museum, Madrid)
 Jan van Eyck – Portrait of a Man (Self Portrait?)
 1434: Jan van Eyck – Arnolfini portrait
 c.1434: Stefano di Giovanni
 Madonna of Humility with Saints (Triptych)
 San Domenico da Cortona Polyptych
 c.1434–1436: Jan van Eyck – The Annunciation (National Gallery of Art, Washington, D.C.)
 c.1434–1446: Workshop of Rogier van der Weyden – The Annunciation (Musée du Louvre)
 1435–1438: Rogier van der Weyden – The Magdalen Reading
 c.1435–1440: Rogier van der Weyden (attrib.) – Saint Luke Drawing the Virgin
 1435: Stefano di Giovanni – The Journey of the Magi (Metropolitan Museum of Art, New York)
 c.1435
 Jan van Eyck – Madonna of Chancellor Rolin
 Konrad Witz – Heilspiegel Altarpiece and St. Christopher
 1436
 Paolo Uccello – Funerary Monument to Sir John Hawkwood (fresco painting, Florence Cathedral)
 Jan van Eyck – The Madonna with Canon van der Paele (Groeningemuseum)
 1437: Domenico di Bartolo – Virgin and Child (Philadelphia Museum of Art)
 c.1437
 Stefano di Giovanni – Polyptych of St. Anthony the Abbot (Cortona)
 Jan van Eyck – Lucca Madonna
 c.1437-1438: Fra Angelico – Perugia Altarpiece
 c.1437-1444: Stefano di Giovanni
 Ecstasy of Saint Francis (Villa i Tatti, Settignano)
 Saint Francis Receiving Stigmata (National Gallery, London)
 c.1437-1446: Fra Angelico – The Annunciation (San Marco, Florence)
 1438: Domenico di Bartolo – Polyptych of Santa Giuliana (Galleria Nazionale dell'Umbria, Perugia)
 c.1438-1440: Jan van Eyck – Madonna in the Church
 1439: Jan van Eyck – Portrait of Margareta van Eyck (Groeningemuseum)

Sculpture
 c.1425–1466: Donatello – David (bronze; Bargello, Florence)
 c. 1430 - Donatello - Dovizia (Mercato Vecchio lost)
 1431–1438: Luca della Robbia – Cantoria (carved singing loft, Florence Cathedral)
 c.1435: Lorenzo Ghiberti – Gates of Paradise (bronze panels; doors of Florence Baptistery)
 1438: Donatello - St. John the Baptist (wood, Santa Maria Gloriosa dei Frari, Venice)

Births
 1430: Michel Colombe – French sculptor (died 1513)
 1430: Jean Colombe – French miniature painter and illuminator of manuscripts (died 1493)
 1430: Desiderio da Settignano – Italian sculptor (died 1464)
 1430: Vincenzo Foppa – Italian painter (died 1515)
 1430: Matteo di Giovanni – Italian Renaissance artist from the Sienese School (died 1495)
 1430: Francesco Laurana – Dalmatian-born sculptor and medallist (died 1502)
 1430: Pier Antonio Mezzastris – Italian painter of the Umbrian school of painting (died 1506)
 1430: Fra Diamante – Italian fresco painter (died 1498)
 1430: Carlo Crivelli – Italian Renaissance painter of conservative Late Gothic decorative sensibility (died 1495)
 1430: Antonello da Messina – Sicilian painter (died 1479)
 1430: Hans Memling – Early Netherlandish painter (died 1494)
 1430: Giovanni Bellini – Italian painter (died 1516)
 1430: Simone Papa the Elder – Italian painter (died 1480)
 1430: Cosimo Tura – Italian painter and one of the founders of the School of Ferrara (died 1495)
 1430: Di Biagio Baldassarre del Firenze – Italian Renaissance painter of the Florentine School (died 1484)
 1431: Shingei –  Japanese painter and artist of the Muromachi period (died 1485)
 1431: Andrea Mantegna – Italian Renaissance artist (died 1506)
 1433: Felice Feliciano - Italian calligrapher, composer of alchemical sonnets and expert on Roman antiquity (died 1479)
 1433: Marco Zoppo -  Italian painter active mainly in Bologna (died 1498)
 1434: Kanō Masanobu – Japanese chief painter of the Ashikaga shogunate and founder of the Kanō school of painting (died 1530)
 1434: Tosa Mitsunobu – Japanese painter and founder of the Tosa school of painting (died 1525)
 1434: Michael Wolgemut – German painter and printmaker (died 1519)
 1435: Andrea del Verrocchio – influential Italian sculptor, goldsmith and painter working at the court of Lorenzo de' Medici in Florence (died 1488)
 1435: Pietro Lombardo – Italian sculptor and architect (died 1515)
 1435: Michael Pacher – Austrian Tyrolean painter and sculptor (died 1498)
 1435: Andrea della Robbia – Italian sculptor, especially in ceramics (died 1525)
 1435: Bartolomeo Sanvito – Paduan calligrapher (died 1518)
 1435: Nicolas Froment – French painter (died 1486)
 1435: Bernt Notke – German painter and sculptor (died 1508/1509)
 1435: Giovanni Santi – Italian painter, poet and father of Raphael (died 1494)
 1435: Jan Polack – Polish-born German painter (died 1519)
 1435/1440: Bertoldo di Giovanni – Italian sculptor (died 1491)
 1436: Baccio Baldini – Italian engraver in Florence (died 1487)
 1436: Benvenuto di Giovanni – Italian artist, manuscripts (died 1509/1517)
 1436: Sheikh Hamdullah – Ottoman master of Islamic calligraphy (died 1520)
 1436: Ni Duan – Imperial Chinese painter of people and landscapes (died 1505)
 1437: Simone Ferrucci – Italian sculptor (died 1493)
 1438: Melozzo da Forlì – Italian fresco painter and member of the Forlì painting school (died 1494)
 1439: Cosimo Rosselli – Italian painter of the Quattrocento, active mainly in Florence (died 1507)
 1439: Domenico Rosselli – Italian sculptor (died 1498)
 1439: Francesco di Giorgio – Italian painter of the Sienese School, sculptor, architect, art theorist and military engineer (died 1502)

Deaths
 1430: Andrei Rublev – the greatest medieval Russian painter of icons and frescos (born 1360-1370)
 1430: Daniil Chyorny – Russian icon painter (born 1360)
 1430: Madern Gerthener – German late Gothic stonemason, sculptor and architect (born 1360/1370)
 1431: Li Zai – Chinese painter of landscapes and human figures during the Ming Dynasty (born unknown)
 1435: Zhu Zhanji, Xuande Emperor – Emperor of China who was also a painter, especially of animals (born 1398)
 1437: Pellegrino di Giovanni – Italian painter (born unknown)
 1438: Jacopo della Quercia – Italian sculptor of the Italian Renaissance (born 1374)
 1439: Jacobello del Fiore – Italian quattrocento painter (born 1370)

References

 
Art
Years of the 15th century in art